Mário Juruna (September 3, 1942 or 1943 – July 18, 2002) was the first national-level federal representative in Brazil that belonged to an indigenous people.

Biography
He was born in Namurunjá village, near Barra do Garças, in the state of Mato Grosso, the son of the Xavante cacique (chief) Apoenã. He lived in the jungle, without contact with civilization, until the age of 17, when he became cacique.
 
In the 1970s he became famous for walking the halls of FUNAI, in Brasilia to fight for land rights of Indians, while carrying a tape recorder, which he used to record everything that was said to him and to prove that the authorities, in most cases, did not keep their word. 
 
He was elected to the Chamber of Deputies of Brazil by the Democratic Labour Party from 1983–1987, representing Rio de Janeiro. His election had strong repercussions in Brazil and the world. He was responsible for the creation of a permanent commission for Indians, which brought formal recognition to issues related to Indians. In 1984, he denounced the businessman Calim Eid for having attempted to bribe him to vote for Paulo Maluf, the presidential candidate supported by the military regime then in power. He voted for Tancredo Neves, the democratic opposition candidate. He was not reelected in 1986, but he remained active in politics for several years. With his mandate ended, and abandoned by his tribe, he remained in Brasilia and died on July 18, 2002, due to complications from diabetes.

References

Further reading
Conklin, Beth A. & Graham, Laura R. 1995. "The Shifting Middle Ground". American Anthropologist; 97(4):695-710
Ulisses Capozzoli. "Tributo a um chefe indígena" (in Portuguese). Observatório da Imprensa. Retrieved July 27, 2011.
Graham, Laura R. 2011.  Quoting Mario Juruna:  Linguistic imagery and the transformation of indigenous voice in the Brazilian print press.  American Ethnologist 38(1): 164-182.

External links

Biografia de Mário Juruna 
Notícia do falecimento de Mário Juruna 

1940s births
2002 deaths
People from Mato Grosso
Democratic Labour Party (Brazil) politicians
Members of the Chamber of Deputies (Brazil) from Rio de Janeiro (state)
Xavante people
Deaths from diabetes
Indigenous leaders of the Americas
Indigenous rights activists
Indigenous people of Eastern Brazil
Brazilian politicians of indigenous peoples descent